The Anglo-Swedish Alliance was signed by Bulstrode Whitelocke, representing the Commonwealth of England, and Christina, Queen of Sweden, in Uppsala, Sweden in 1654. Its main purpose was to offset the alliance between Denmark and the Netherlands. It was signed on April 28, but antedated April 11.

References

Anglo-Swedish alliance
Anglo-Swedish alliance
Swedish alliance
Anglo-Swedish alliance
17th-century military alliances
Sweden, 1654
England, 1654
Sweden–United Kingdom military relations
England–Sweden relations
Christina, Queen of Sweden